MI8 or MI-8 may refer to:

 AMD's MI8, a brand of deep learning oriented Graphics Processing Units, see Radeon Instinct
 MI8, the World War II British signals intelligence agency
 Mil Mi-8, the Soviet-designed helicopter
 Mitten im 8en, an Austrian TV soap/comedy series 
 Black Chamber, the United States' first peacetime cryptanalytic organization
 
 M-8 (Michigan highway)
 Xiaomi Mi 8, smartphone developed by Xiaomi
Mission: Impossible – Dead Reckoning Part Two, an upcoming spy-thriller film starring Tom Cruise